Bent Mejding (born 14 January 1937) is a Danish actor, stage director and theatre manager. He won a Danish Film Academy Award in 1985 and 2007. He is married to the actress Susse Wold.

Career
Mejding had his debut at Folketeatret in Copenhagen and later appeared in several productions at Det Ny Teater up through the 1960s. In 1961, he founded Ungdommens Teater which from 1964 was based at Frederiksberg-Scenen. From 1992 until 1997, together with Niels-Bo Valbro, he managed Det Ny Teater which reopened after a major refurbishment in 1994.

Filmography

Film

Television

References

External links
 
 The Danish film institute

Danish male stage actors
Danish male television actors
Danish male film actors
Best Supporting Actor Bodil Award winners
People from Svendborg
1937 births
Living people
Danish theatre directors